National Route 495 is a national highway of Japan connecting between Wakamatsu-ku, Kitakyushu and Higashi-ku, Fukuoka in Japan, with total length has 63.4 km (39.4 mi).

References

495
Roads in Fukuoka Prefecture